A paper bag is a bag made of paper, usually kraft paper. Paper bags can be made either with virgin or recycled fibres to meet customers’ demands. Paper bags are commonly used as shopping carrier bags and for packaging of some consumer goods. They carry a wide range of products from groceries, glass bottles, clothing, books, toiletries, electronics and various other goods and can also function as means of transport in day-to-day activities.

History
In 1852, Francis Wolle, a schoolteacher, invented the first machine to mass-produce paper bags. Wolle and his brother patented the machine and founded the Union Paper Bag Company.

In 1853, James Baldwin, papermaker of Birmingham and Kings Norton in England, was granted a patent for apparatus to make square-bottomed paper bags. Thereafter he used an image of a flat-bottomed bag as his business logo.

In 1871, inventor Margaret E. Knight designed a machine that could create flat-bottomed paper bags, which could carry more than the previous envelope-style design.

In 1883, Charles Stilwell patented a machine that made square-bottom paper bags with pleated sides, making them easier to fold and store. This style of bag came to be known as the S.O.S., or "Self-Opening Sack".

In 1912, Walter Deubener, a grocer in Saint Paul, Minnesota, used cord to reinforce paper bags and add carrying handles. These "Deubener Shopping Bags" could carry up to 75 pounds at a time, and became quite popular, selling over a million bags a year by 1915. Paper bags with handles later became the standard for department stores, and were often printed with the store's logo or brand colors.

Plastic bags were introduced in the 1970s, and thanks to their lower cost, eventually replaced paper bags as the bag of choice for grocery stores. With the trend towards phasing out lightweight plastic bags, though, some grocers and shoppers have switched back to paper bags.

Kroger decided to look into switching to plastic in 1986, because they could save 3 cents per bag. There was a meeting held with employees at Store 100, Toledo, Ohio, asking for ideas for the store, & management dropped a cardboard box on the table. After looking at the product one of the baggers burst out laughing & said, "so you're going to switch to plastic to save 3 cents per bag, but now you need 2 baggers at each register, 1 to hold the bag open & 1 to put the groceries in, or you will have a line all the way to the back of the store. The panicked & asked him how to fix it.. & he asked for a wire hanger & a paper hole punch. Then drew the plastic bag dispenser on paper. His name was Joseph Poirier. So essentially, he invented both the plastic bag with holes in the arm & the plastic bag dispenser on the spot, & he was still in high school.

In 2015, the world's largest paper shopping bag was made in the UK and recorded by Guinness World Records. Also in 2015: The European Union adopted directive (EU) 2015/720, that requires a reduction in the consumption of single use plastic bags per person to 90 by 2019 and to 40 by 2025.

In 2018, the “European Paper Bag Day” was established by the platform The Paper Bag, an association of the leading European kraft paper manufacturers and producers of paper bags. The annual action day takes place on 18 October and aims to raise awareness among consumers about paper carrier bags as a sustainable packaging solution. It was launched to encourage more people to act responsibly and use, reuse and recycle paper bags. With different activities on local level, the association wants to open a dialogue with consumers and give them revealing insights about paper packaging.

In April 2019, the European Union adopted Directive (EU) 2019/904 of the European Parliament and of the Council of 5 June 2019 on the reduction of the impact of certain plastic products on the environment.

Construction
Standard brown paper bags are made from kraft paper. Tote-style paper carrier bags, such as those often used by department stores or as gift bags, can be made from any kind of paper, and come in any color. There are two different styles of handles for paper carrier bags: flat handles and cord handles. Paper carrier bags made from virgin kraft paper are developed especially for demanding packaging. Paper bags can be made from recycled paper, with some local laws requiring bags to have a minimum percentage of post-consumer recycled content.

Paper bags can be made to withstand more pressure or weight than plastic bags do.

Single layer 

Paper shopping bags, brown paper bags, grocery bags, paper bread bags and other light duty bags have a single layer of paper. A variety of constructions and designs are available. Many are printed with the names of stores and brands. Paper bags are not waterproof. Types of paper bag are: laminated, twisted, flat tap. The laminated bag, whilst not totally waterproof, has a laminate that protects the outside to some degree.

Multiwall paper sacks

Multiwall (or multi-wall) paper sacks, also referred to as industrial paper bags, industrial sacks or shipping sacks are often used for packaging and transporting dry powdery and granulated materials such as fertilizer, animal feed, sand, dry chemicals, flour and cement. Many have several layers of sack papers, printed external layer and inner plies.  Some paper sacks have a plastic film,  foil, or polyethylene coated paper layer in between as a water-repellant, insect resistant, or rodent barrier.

There are two basic designs of bags: open-mouth bags and valve bags. An open-mouth bag is a tube of paper plies with the bottom end sealed. The bag is filled through the open mouth and then closed by stitching, adhesive, or tape. Valve sacks have both ends closed and are filled through a valve. A typical example of a valve bag is the cement sack.

Quality standard and certification
Paper bag durability can be measured in accordance with the European test standard EN13590:2003. This standard is based on scientifically conducted studies and helps retailers to avoid poor-quality carrier bags. The quality certification system for paper bags is based on this standard. The test method subjects the carrier bag to heavy weights while being lifted repeatedly. The size of the paper bag is taken into account because the larger its volume, the heavier the load it must be able to carry. As a result of the certification, the paper bag is marked with the weight and volume it may carry. It is wise to choose a tested and certified paper bag.

Sustainability
The raw material used in papermaking – cellulose fibre extracted from wood – is a renewable and natural resource. However, environmental concerns have been raised about types of wood harvesting, such as clearcutting. Due to their biodegradable characteristics, paper bags degrade in a short period of time (two to five months). When using natural water-based colours and starch-based adhesives, paper bags do not harm the environment. 

Most paper bags that are produced in Europe are made from cellulose fibres that are sourced from sustainably managed European forests. They are extracted from tree thinning and from process waste from the sawn timber industry. Sustainable forest management maintains biodiversity and ecosystems and provides a habitat for wildlife, recreational areas and jobs. This sustainable forest management is proven in the FSC® or PEFC™ certifications of paper products. Consumers can look for the FSC and PEFC labels on their paper bags to make sure they are made from sustainably sourced fibres.

As a wood product, paper continues to store carbon throughout its lifetime. This carbon sequestration time is extended when the paper is recycled, because the carbon remains in the cellulose fibres.

Paper bags can be used several times. Paper bag manufacturers recommend reusing paper carrier bags as often as possible in order to further decrease the environmental impact.

Recycling

Paper bags are highly biodegradable and recyclable, and hence does not pose the same environmental footprint as plastic bags do. The fibres are reused 3.6 times on average in Europe, while the world average is 2.4 times.

Plastic or water-resistant coatings or layers make recycling more difficult. Paper bag recycling is done through the re-pulping of the paper recycling and pressing into the required shapes.

Safety 
Compared to plastic bags, paper bags present less suffocation risk to young children or animals.

Branding and marketing
Paper shopping bags can be used as a vehicle to project the brand image of retailers. Paper is very tactile due to its texture and shape. Its print quality and color reproduction allow for creativity in advertising and development of the brand image. Furthermore, they achieve maximum visibility and great appreciation from customers. Using paper bags gives a signal of commitment to the environment and by using packaging made from renewable, recyclable and biodegradable sources, retailers and brand owners contribute to reducing the use of non-biodegradable shopping bags. Paper carrier bags can be a visible part of corporate social responsibility, and they are in line with a sustainable consumer lifestyle.

Brown bag
While brown is the most common paper bag color (as it is the natural color of the wood fibre used to make the paper), the term “brown bag” (especially as a verb) refers to two specific and distinct practices:

The first form of “brown bagging” refers to bringing food from home (regardless of the actual container used) instead of buying a meal at or near one’s destination. Most often, it means bringing a packed lunch to school or work. For example, a 1983 study reported that America had 60 million “brown baggers.”

Individuals may choose to brown bag to save money; if options to buy food are limited or absent; or to accommodate medical, religious, or lifestyle dietary requirements (e.g. low-fat or low-salt, kosher or halal, vegetarian or vegan). Additionally, while “a substantial minority of brown baggers have access to microwave ovens or refrigerators,” those who do not need to ensure their food can stay fresh until mealtime without refrigeration (possibly bringing their own, via ice packs and thermal bags), and be ready to eat without being reheated.

The noun form of the term included in the Merriam-Webster dictionary in 1950 refers to use of a paper bag instead of a lunch box. William Safire traces this to an article in Time magazine.

The second form of “brown bagging” involves drinking alcohol in places where it is not legal to do so (such as a public park, or a venue without a liquor license) while using a brown paper bag (or a black plastic bag, or other suitably opaque covering) to conceal the bottle or can. While it’s usually an open secret that a drink handled like this almost always contains alcohol (as there’s little reason to hide other drinks), depending on local laws, this can minimize the chance of legal consequences. If there’s no law against generally keeping open containers in bags, then doing so does not, in and of itself, give police probable cause to search a bag for alcohol.

Anti-brown-bag law in New York, USA
In 1967, it was stated that "brown-bagging is the genteel disguise ... by a patron to furnish his own liquor when he dines at the local restaurant".

In 1985, the New York State Liquor Authority pushed for legislation (informally referred to as "the anti-brown-bag law") to prevent patrons from bringing alcoholic beverages into food establishments that do not have a liquor license. New York City Mayor Ed Koch, having been "arrested" for doing so months earlier, denounced the effort.

Brown Bag Report
The advertising agent who, prior to the Marlboro Man, developed ads for the product as a filtered "feminine brand" in 1981 developed "The Brown-Bag Report" with funding from Swift, Carnation, General Mills and American Can.

Symbolism
While in the United States the lunch box or lunch pail has been used as a symbol of the working class, Safire wrote: "In the metaphor of the modern worker, the brown bag has replaced the lunch pail."

About a third of the brown baggers are schoolchildren.

The "Brown Paper Bag Test" formed part of a colorist discriminatory practice in African-American history, in which an individual's skin tone was compared to the color of a brown paper bag.

Paper bags are occasionally worn over the head as symbol of embarrassment.

Associations
The platform The Paper Bag consists of leading European paper manufacturers and producers of paper bags. It was created in 2017 to represent the interests of the European paper bag industry and to promote the advantages of paper packaging. The Paper Bag is steered by the organisations CEPI Eurokraft and EUROSAC.

Other uses 
Paper bags are commonly used for carrying items.  However, they have been used for other purposes.  In 1911, the English chef Nicolas Soyer wrote a cookbook, Paper-Bag Cookery, about how to use clean, odorless paper bags for cooking, as an extension of the en papillote technique and an alternative to pots and pans.

References

Further reading

 Yam, K. L., "Encyclopedia of Packaging Technology", John Wiley & Sons, 2009,  

American inventions
Bags
Paper products
Domestic implements
Food storage containers
Disposable products